Howstrake Camp Halt (Manx: Stadd Campal Howstrake) (occasionally "Howstrake Holiday Camp Station", with or without the station suffix) is a stop on the Manx Electric Railway on the Isle of Man located at the line's first summit on the climb from the terminus, before descending into the nearby valley.

Usage
The station was used almost exclusively in conjunction with the nearby holiday camp from which it gained its name and despite the closure of the camp in 1985 remains a functioning request tram stop today.  It also retains its original stone-built waiting shelter albeit in a poor state of repair, which has its name painted on the rear wall facing out to sea and bears the legend "Howstrake Holiday Camp Station" along its roof line.  The building has been in a poor state of repair for a number of years and is now fenced-off.  Originally the building was erected by and maintained by the owners of the holiday camp.

Today
The station has remained nominally open in recent times since the closure of the adjacent holiday camp but facilities have not been maintained on site for many years. After part of the roof collapsed, the station building was closed and fenced-off around 2015 and remains so today (2021). Tramcars do still stop here but only on request of passengers, or by flagging down a passing car to board. Being situated on an exposed coastal headland the shelter formerly provided welcome respite for walkers, the coastal road being a popular walk.

Locality

Today the area is in a state of decay as can be seen from the dilapidated state of this once-grand entrance area. The station is something of an oddity, being that the shelter is on the "wrong side" compared to the entrance gates meaning that the road must be crossed between the two when there is in fact sufficient land for the shelter on the railway side of the road which is taken up by large entrance gates; upon first glance these gates appear to lead nowhere, but they actually once led to a tunnel which was the official entrance to the camp proper, located on the rocks below the tramlines, and the entrance point to the tunnel can be seen from the passing trams a few yards further down the line, noted by a substantial stone wall to the left of the running lines. The tunnel had however been sealed off since the closure of the camp, but the small toll cottage can still be made out in the undergrowth on the other side of the line.

Holiday Camp

The camp itself sprawled across the hillside overlooking the Groudle Glen Railway on the adjacent hillside and some of the chalets remain today; the area is private property but reasonable views of it can be achieved from the outer terminus of the aforementioned railway, and some information about the site is also available here.  The camp was first developed as a male-only tented village with all accommodation being in the form of distinctive looking bell tents. In the late 19th century it caused scandal by becoming the first camp on the island available to both sexes and it was operated by the same company that ran the enormously successful Cunningham's Camp in Douglas some four miles away. During the Second World War the camp was used as a music school by the Royal Naval School of Music before returning to holiday use upon cessation of the hostilities.  Latterly it was a seasonal affair and after a fire ripped through the main dining hall in 1985 it closed.

Route

Also
Manx Electric Railway Stations

References

Sources
 Manx Electric Railway Stopping Places (2002) Manx Electric Railway Society
 Island Images: Manx Electric Railway Pages (2003) Jon Wornham
 Official Tourist Department Page (2009) Isle Of Man Heritage Railways

Railway stations in the Isle of Man
Manx Electric Railway
Railway stations opened in 1893